Pathinonnil Vyazham is a 2010 Indian Malayalam-language comedy-drama film directed by Suresh Krishnan and written by Mahesh Mitra, starring Mukesh and Manya. This film was made in 2005, but was released five years later. Both C.I. Paul and James passed away by this time.

Plot

Appu works as a bearer in a five star hotel at Palakkad. He happens to meet Chandran Pillai once, who is a millionaire based in Ooty. Appu rescues Chandran Pillai from an accident. When Chandran Pillai returns to Ooty, the people who were after him turn towards Appu instead. So Appu rushes to Ooty and begs Chandran Pillai to give him a job. Chandran Pillai refuses, but when Appu tries to blackmail him with a secret, he gives in, and appoints him as his driver.

Meenakshi, Chandran Pillai's daughter hates Appu and repeatedly dismisses him from the job, but Chandran Pillai takes him back, much to her frustration.

Cast
Mukesh as Appu Kuttan / Theraka Bhagawathar
Manya as Meenakshi
C.I. Paul as Chandran Pillai
Nedumudi Venu as Kizhakkedan
Jagathy Sreekumar as Nakulan
Sadiq as Victor Williams
Beena Antony as Kalyani
James as security guard
Shaju
Sree Rekha

References

External links

2010s Malayalam-language films
2010 romantic comedy films
2010 films
2010 directorial debut films
Indian romantic comedy films
Films shot in Palakkad
Films shot in Ooty